Gaita zuliana (often simply called "gaita") is a style of Venezuelan folk music (and dance) from Maracaibo, Zulia State. According to Joan Coromines, it may come from the word "gaits," the Gothic word for "goat", which is the skin generally used for the membrane of the furro drum. Other instruments used in gaita include maracas, cuatro, charrasca and tambora. Song themes range from the romantic to the political.

The style became popular throughout Venezuela in the 1960s, and it fused with other styles such as salsa and merengue in the 1970s. It is not to be confused with the gaita escocesa, also known simply as gaita, which is Spanish for bagpipes.

Famous gaita groups include Cardenales del Éxito, Rincón Morales, Estrellas del Zulia, Barrio Obrero, Gran Coquivacoa, Saladillo, Universidad de la Gaita, Koquimba, Melody Gaita, and Maracaibo 15. The group Guaco started as a gaita group but now plays a unique and distinct style of music influenced by many Afro-Caribbean and Iberian rhythms. An important singer involved in Gaita Zuliana music is Ricardo Aguirre, "El Monumental de la Gaita" or the Monumental Artist of the Gaita.

Trinidad and Tobago has adopted gaita with some variation, calling it parang.

References

Further reading
 Carruyo, L. (2005), "La gaita zuliana: Music and the politics of protest in Venezuela", Latin American Perspectives 32 (3), pp. 98–111
 
Carroll, Robert Thomas (2013). "Feeling Zulian through Gaita: Singing Regional Identity in Maracaibo, Venezuela" (PDF). University of Washington.

Venezuelan music
Zulia
Latin American folk music